Jillian Rosemary Broadbent  (born 1948) is an Australian public figure and businesswoman.

Early life
Broadbent attended Ravenswood School for Girls and graduated with the degrees of Bachelor of Arts majoring in economics and Mathematics from the University of Sydney. She is the daughter of John Raymond Broadbent (Major General)

Career
Broadbent is a member of the board of Macquarie Bank. Prior to that she was a Director of Woolworths, the National Portrait Gallery, the Reserve Bank of Australia and Chair of the Clean Energy Finance Corporation. She was Chancellor of the University of Wollongong (UOW) for 11 years, until September 2020. She also has been a Director of the Australian Securities Exchange, Special Broadcasting Service and Qantas.

Earlier in her career she spent 30 years in the banking sector in Australia and overseas, most recently as a senior executive and departmental head at Bankers Trust Australia. 

In 2017 she (along with Graeme Samuel and John Laker) formed a panel of inquiry into the culture of the Commonwealth Bank of Australia.

Awards and honours
In 2001, Broadbent was awarded the Centenary Medal "for service to Australian society in business leadership". In 2003, Broadbent was appointed an Officer of the Order of Australia for service to economic and financial development of Australia. On Australia Day 2019, Broadbent was appointed a Companion of the Order of Australia "for eminent service to corporate, financial, clean energy and cultural organisations, to higher education, and to women in business".

In 2018 Broadbent was elected as a Fellow of the Royal Society of New South Wales. Jillian Broadbent holds honorary degrees from Western Sydney University (2000) and the University of Wollongong (2021). Ben Quilty's (2021) portrait of her hangs in UOW's new Arts and Social Sciences building, which was named after her in recognition of her role as the University's third Chancellor.

References

1948 births
Australian women in business
Businesspeople from Sydney
Companions of the Order of Australia
Officers of the Order of Australia
Recipients of the Centenary Medal
University of Sydney alumni
Chancellors of the University of Wollongong
Living people
Fellows of the Royal Society of New South Wales